Frank Hall (24 February 1921 – 21 September 1995) was an Irish broadcaster, journalist, satirist and film censor.  He is best remembered for his satirical revue programme Hall's Pictorial Weekly.

Early life
Born in Newry, County Down, Hall received little more than a primary education as he left school at the age of twelve to work in a local shop.  He later worked as a waiter in London before moving to Dublin.  On his return he joined the art department of the Irish Independent. Hall subsequently worked with the Evening Herald where he wrote a column on dance bands.

Television
After that, he moved to RTÉ where he worked in the newsroom.  From 1964 to 1971 he presented Newsbeat , a regional news programme. He also presented The Late Late Show for the opening of the 1964 season, but his lack of success in that seat led to the return of the previous presenter, Gay Byrne. When Newsbeat ended, Hall started writing and presenting Hall's Pictorial Weekly, a political satire show that ran for over 250 episodes until 1980. He served as spokesperson for the Irish jury in the Eurovision Song Contest 1965 and 1966.

Hall won two Jacob's Awards, in 1966 and 1975, for his work on Newsbeat and Hall's Pictorial Weekly respectively.

Film censor
In 1978, Hall was appointed Ireland's national film censor. During his period as censor he was known for his strict application of Irish censorship and his defence of family values. Among the films banned by him was Monty Python's Life of Brian, which he described as "offensive to Christians and to Jews as well, because it made them appear a terrible load of gobshites".

Family controversy
Hall had a long running affair with a young colleague from RTÉ, though married to Aideen Kearney at the time. It has also been widely accepted that he had a daughter in 1956 with RTÉ presenter Frankie Byrne; this was disputed, at the time, by Hall family members.  Hall's relationship with Frankie Byrne was placed in the public domain in a Mint Production programme, Dear Frankie screened on RTE in January 2006.  In 2010, a play written by Niamh Gleeson, also entitled Dear Frankie, opened in the Liberty Hall theatre. Later in 2012, it opened again in the Gaiety Theatre, going on to play in theatres across the  country.

Death
Hall died of a heart attack in Dublin in 1995. He is buried in Dardistown Cemetery in North Dublin.

References

1921 births
1995 deaths
Burials at Dardistown Cemetery
Irish Independent people
Irish television talk show hosts
Jacob's Award winners
People from Newry
RTÉ newsreaders and journalists
Satirists from Northern Ireland
The Herald (Ireland) people